Chancellor and Patrick was a Melbourne based architecture firm, formed in 1953 and dissolved in 1981, is best known for their numerous houses from the mid 1950s to the mid 1960s, designed in their signature dynamic, expressive take on 'organic' architecture.

The practice
William Rex Patrick (born 28 October 1927) ventured into architecture at a young age, entering into articles at the office of Parnell and Pierce aged 14 for six months. He then studied at Brighton Technical School, went on to the Melbourne Technical College Architecture Course, and finally the School of Architecture at the University of Melbourne, graduating in 1949.
David Chancellor (born 7 September 1926) studied civil engineering from 1943 to 1945 at the Melbourne Technical College, served two years in the Navy, then went on to the School of Architecture at the University of Melbourne, graduating in 1951. The two met at the firm Yuncken Freeman Brothers in late 1951, where they formed a close working relationship, submitting several competitions together. Chancellor set up his own firm in the distant beachside suburb of Frankston in 1952, and Patrick joined him formally in the middle of 1954, establishing the practice of Chancellor and Patrick. In 1958, they established a second office in South Yarra, continued to prosper, and built up a practice that eventually employed 30 staff.

Chancellor and Patrick began with a variety of expressive houses, mostly holiday homes, on the Mornington Peninsula, where the firm began. They soon developed their own distinctive style; an amalgam of features of Frank Lloyd Wright's Prairie and Usonian houses, the houses of Californian architect Harwell Hamilton Harris, and their own innovations. They featured dynamic plans, emphasised by projecting intersecting wings or bays with expressed, overhanging gable or flat roofs, dramatic cantilevers, strong horizontals with occasional verticals, off-centre supports, expressed structure, butt-jointed corner windows, and integration with the landscape. Many can be found on the Peninsula, as well as many dotted around the 1950s and 60s suburbs and area of Melbourne, especially the Bayside suburbs. They are said to have designed (if not built) over 1000 houses in their career. Their houses of the late 1960s onwards were often larger, and evolved into brown brick, skillion roofed compositions, more ground hugging, and more in tune with the 'environmental' designs of their contemporaries.  Throughout their career, they also designed many non-residential projects, including a number of churches, pre-school buildings and a hospital, as well as banks and other commercial work. Their largest projects were all the halls of residence at Monash University, and Chisholm College at La Trobe University.

Notable projects

McCraith House

The McCraith House, commonly known as the Butterfly House, was built on the sleepy bush blackboards of the Mornington Peninsula for Ellen and Gerald McCraith in 1954 by Chancellor and Patrick.  The McCraith House is an example of structural inspired modernism in Victoria in the 1950s with its cutting-edge design and ground-breaking structural engineering, of triangular tubular steel framing system and butterfly roof. Positioned strategically on a stone-walled plinth overlooking Port Philip Bay, the house remains in the same family, complete with original interiors, furniture and even crockery all of which was donated to RMIT in 2013, and the house now houses their writers in residence program.

ES&A Bank Building
The former ES&A Bank Building was built on the corner of Elizabeth and Franklin Street, Melbourne, in 1959–60 by Melbourne architects Chancellor and Patrick. Originally intended to be a 12-storey office tower, only the base banking chamber section was built at the time. The most distinctive features of the building are the massive rock-faced random coursed Dromana granite pier/wall sections, dominating the side elevation, topped by a thin floating slab roof projecting over the recessed front elevation. The space between the stone piers on the Franklin Street elevation is filled with a patterned, vertical ribbed concrete screen. The building is considered to display influences from International modernism, and the organic sensibilities of Frank Lloyd Wright as well as the Griffins. The extra floors were added in 2004, but as an apartment building with regular glass balconies, rather than the originally proposed solid masonry balconies projecting every second floor, and various changes to the original base section have infilled openings in the front facade, and undermined the floating qualities of the original roof.

Freiberg House
The Freiberg House was built in 1958–60 on a sloping site as a residence for the Freiberg family and is located at 26 Yarravale Road Kew, Victoria. Featured on the cover of Best Australian Houses (1961), edited by Neil Clerehan, the Freiberg house is a significant example of the work of Chancellor and Patrick. It features most of the hallmarks of their subsequent 1960s houses, such as projecting wings on a cruciform or pin-wheel plan, each with gable roofs, dramatic projecting cantilevered ends, overhanging eaves, expressed post-and-beam construction, off-center spaces under otherwise centered roofs, and a central solid spine, containing the entry and main stairs. It is also notable for having the first entirely native garden planned by Edna Walling, with whom Chancellor and Patrick was a long-time collaborator.

See also

Architecture of Australia

References

Architecture firms of Australia
Design companies established in 1953
Design companies disestablished in 1981
Australian companies established in 1953
Australian companies disestablished in 1981